The Stolen Treaty is a 1917 American silent drama film directed by Paul Scardon and written by Helmer Walton Bergman and Thomas Edgelow.  The film stars Earle Williams, Denton Vane, and Bernard Seigel.

Cast list

References

American silent feature films
1917 films
1917 drama films
American black-and-white films
Films directed by Paul Scardon
Silent American drama films
1910s English-language films
1910s American films